Sir Henry Waterfield,  (1837-1913) was a British civil servant who was private secretary to successive Secretaries of State for India, and for 23 years Financial Secretary in the India Office.

Biography
Waterfield was born in 1837, and entered the civil service at a very young age, in the early 1850s. He came to the India Office in 1858, and worked there for 44 years, as private secretary to successive Secretaries of State for India, and in four different departments; the Military, Public Works, Revenue and Commerce, and Financial departments. In 1879 he was appointed Financial Secretary, and served as such until he resigned in July 1902. Among important events during his tenure was the closing of the Indian mints to silver in 1893, following advise from the Indian Currency Committee. There were also continuous debate about the contribution of the Indian colonies to the Imperial government, which he was instrumental in helping to resolve.

Waterfield was appointed a Companion of the Order of the Bath (CB) in 1885, was knighted as a Knight Commander of the Order of the Star of India (KCSI) in 1893, and on his retirement he was appointed a Knight Grand Commander of the Order of the Indian Empire (GCIE) in the 1902 Coronation Honours.

Following his retirement, he settled in Bournemouth.

Family
Waterfield married first Catherine Jane Wood (1841-1882). Following her death, he married secondly, in 1885, Mary Augusta Shee, daughter of Edward Obré Shee. There were at least two sons; Richard Waterfield (1875-1959) and Lieutenant Horace Clare Waterfield (d.1918)

References

1837 births
1913 deaths
Knights Commander of the Order of the Star of India
Knights Grand Commander of the Order of the Indian Empire
Companions of the Order of the Bath